Hanna Mortkowicz-Olczakowa (15 October 1905 – 5 January 1968) was a Polish poet and writer. She was the writer of several novels for children and young adults.

Biography 
She was born on 15 October 1905 in Warsaw to a Jewish family, as a daughter of Jakób Mortkowicz (1876-1931), a book publisher and Janina Horwitz (1875-1960), a writer. Her parents were running a bookshop.

Hanna Mortkowicz-Olczakowa graduated in Polish studies and art history from the University of Warsaw, also she studied painting at the Academy of Fine Arts in Warsaw. As a poet she debuted in 1920.

Mortkowicz-Olczakowa received Gold Cross of Merit (1955), Knight's Cross Order of Polonia Restituta (1959) and Officer's Cross Order of Polonia Restituta (1966).

She was married with Tadeusz Olczak. Their daughter, Joanna Olczak-Ronikier is also a writer.

Books 
 1978: Janusz Korczak
 1961: Bunt wspomnień
 1965: O Stefanie Żeromskim: ze wspomnień i dokumentów
 1965: Spadek i inne opowiadania
 1956: Piotr Michałowski. Opowieść o życiu i twórczości
 1930: Niepotrzebne serce
 1927: Podanie o Wandzie: dzieje wątku literackiego

References 

1905 births
1968 deaths
Writers from Warsaw
People from Warsaw Governorate
Jews from the Russian Empire
Polish women writers
Academy of Fine Arts in Warsaw alumni
Jewish Polish writers